is a Japanese castle located in Gyōda, Saitama Prefecture, Japan. During the Edo period, Oshi Castle was the center of the 100,000 koku Oshi Domain, but the castle is far better known for its association with the siege of Oshi during the late Sengoku period. It was regarded as one of the seven main strongholds of the Kantō region

History 
Oshi Castle was completed by Narita Akiyasu around 1479. The Narita family ruled over the area of Gyōda for initially as vassals to the Ogigayatsu Uesugi clan, changing their allegiance to Odawara Hōjō clan in 1546. The castle town was burned down by Uesugi Kenshin in  1574.

The castle made use of marshes and swamplands in its surroundings and was considered impregnable.  In 1590, Toyotomi Hideyoshi dispatched Ishida Mitsunari with an army of 23,000 troops to seize the castle. In the siege of Oshi, the castle’s 619 samurai and 2000 local conscripts held off numerous attacks, including a copy-cat effort to flood the defenders out patterned after Hideyoshi’s famous siege of Takamatsu. Despite Mitsunari’s impressive construction of 28 kilometers of dikes and torrential rains, the castle still held and its defenders only surrendered after receiving word that their overlords had been defeated in the siege of Odawara.

The area came under the control of Tokugawa Ieyasu and the castle was subsequently rebuilt as the center of the 100,000 koku Oshi Domain ruled by a succession of daimyō from various branches of the Matsudaira clan and the Abe clan. The castle town prospered during the Edo period from its proximity to the Nakasendō highway, and location on the Tone River.

Following the Meiji restoration, all of the structures of the castle were destroyed and its site turned into a public park.

Literature

External links

 Oshi Castle Jcastle Profile
Gyoda Local History Museum 

Castles in Saitama Prefecture
Museums in Saitama Prefecture
History museums in Japan
Gyōda
Go-Hōjō clan